The Michigan Territory Militia was the predecessor to the Michigan Army National Guard and existed from 1805-1837 as an entity concurrent with Michigan Territory's existence in the United States.

Colonial and pre-Territorial militias

In the French colonial period, a proposal was made in 1708 to organize the first Michigan militia at Fort Detroit which is referenced in the Cadillac Papers. Following the defeat of the French regime, Michigan militias were also organized during British colonial occupation prior to the arrival of the Americans.

The earliest evidence of a formally organized American-style militia in pre-Territorial Michigan can be traced back to a militia unit participating in a Detroit parade on May 11, 1803. Michigan Territory was organized on June 30, 1805.

Territorial Militia
The official organization of the Michigan Territory in 1805 also included language that allowed for the creation of a militia.

War of 1812
The Michigan Territory Militia existed only on paper until the War of 1812.

Black Hawk War

Creation of Michigan State Militia

Michigan Territory boundaries from 1805-1837

References

Au, Dennis M.  "BEST TROOPS IN THE WORLD": THE MICHIGAN TERRITORIAL MILITIA IN THE DETROIT RIVER THEATER DURING THE WAR OF 1812", GEORGE ROGERS CLARK Selected Papers From The 1991 And 1992 George Rogers Clark Trans-Appalachian Frontier History Conferences, Center for French Colonial Studies, U.S. National Park Service.  U.S. National Park Service, 1992.
Rosentreter, Roger.  Michigan's Early Military Forces: A Roster and History of Troops Activated Prior to the American Civil War.  Detroit, MI:  Wayne State University Press, 2003.

Michigan Territory
Military history of Michigan
Militia in the United States
1812 establishments in Michigan Territory
Black Hawk War
.